Beed Assembly constituency is one of the 288 Vidhan Sabha (legislative assembly) constituencies of Maharashtra state in western India.

Overview
Beed (constituency number 230) is one of the six Vidhan Sabha constituencies located in Beed district. It comprises parts of the Shirur and Beed tehsils of this district.

Beed is part of the Beed Lok Sabha constituency along with all other Vidhan Sabha segments in this district, namely Parli, Majalgaon, Georai, Ashti and Kaij.

This vidhansabha constituency consist 335150 (3 Lack 35 Thousand 150) Voters In Which 178768 Male's, 156379 Female's And 3 Others Till 4 October 2019.

Members of Legislative Assembly
 1962: Kashinath Tatyaba Jadhav, Communist Party of India                        
 1967: Shivajirao Patil, Indian National Congress
 1978: Aadinath Limbaji Nawle, Janata Party
 1980: Rajendra Sahebrao Jagtap, Indian National Congress (Urs)
 1985: Sirajuddin Deshmukh, Indian National Congress
 1990: Prof. Suresh Nivrutti Nawale, Shiv Sena
 1995: Prof. Suresh Nivrutti Nawale, Shiv Sena
 1999: Syed Saleem Ali, Nationalist Congress Party
 2004: Sunil Suryabhan Dhande, Shiv Sena
 2009: Jaydutt Kshirsagar, Nationalist Congress Party
 2014: Jaydutt Kshirsagar, Nationalist Congress Party
 2019: Sandip Kshirsagar, Nationalist Congress Party

See also
 Beed
 List of constituencies of Maharashtra Vidhan Sabha

References

Assembly constituencies of Maharashtra
Beed district